Borgarfjarðarhreppur is a municipality in Iceland. Its main settlement is Bakkagerði. It is located in the Austurland region, in the eastern part of the country, 400 km east of Reykjavík, the country's capital. The average temperature is -2 °C. The warmest month is July, at 9 °C, and the coldest month is February, at -8 °C.

References

Municipalities of Iceland
States and territories disestablished in 2020